Travelling People (German: Fahrendes Volk) is a 1938 German drama film directed by Jacques Feyder and starring Hans Albers, Françoise Rosay and Camilla Horn. It is a circus film. 

It was shot at the Bavaria Studios in Munich. A separate French-language version People Who Travel (Les gens du voyage) was also released. While it was also directed by Feyder and starred Rosay, the rest of the cast were different. It premiered in Hamburg on 1 July 1938 and then at the Ufa-Palast am Zoo on 18 July.

Cast
 Hans Albers as Fernand 
 Françoise Rosay as Madame Flora 
 Camilla Horn as Pepita  
 Hannes Stelzer as Marcel  
 Irene von Meyendorff as Yvonne Barlay  
 Ulla Gauglitz as Suzanne  
 Herbert Hübner as Zirkusdirektor Edward Barlay  
 Alexander Golling as Ganove Tino 
 Otto Stoeckel as Charlot 
 Aribert Mog as Gendarmerieleutnant  
 Hedwig Wangel as Wirtschafterin Yvonnes im Zirkus  
 Willem Holsboer as Verehrer Pepitas  
 Franz Arzdorf as Präfekt
 Bob Bauer as Raubtierverkäufer  
 Lilo Bergen as Autogrammjägerinnen  
 Willy Cronauer as Inspizient im Zirkus in Paris  
 Toni Forster-Larrinaga as Ledhrerin  
 Friedrich Gnaß as Bosko  
 Walter Holten as Joe  
 Magda Lena as Yvonnes Tante  
 Karl Platen as Registrarbeamter  
 Erwin van Roy as Mann, der den Zirkus ankündigt
 Tilly Wedekind as Reiche Amerikanin  
 Herbert Weissbach as Pepitas Verehrer 
 Philipp Veit as Älterer Verehrer Pepitas  
 Franz Schönemann as Gendarm 
 Elsa Andrä Beyer as Autogramjägerinen
 Hans Alpassy as Raubtierwärter 
 Elise Aulinger as Löwenfellgerberin  
 Hans Hanauer as Alte Arzt  
 Hermann Kellein as Gigolo  
 Richard Korn as Schneidermeister bei der Zirkusparade  
 Reinhold Lütjohann as Fleischlieferant für die Tiere im Zirkus  
 Luise Morland as Mädchen bei Hotel du Nord  
 Theodolinde Müller as Tanzschülerin 
 Rudolf Raab as Personalchef im Kaufhaus 
 Eugen Schöndorfer as Kassierer bei Barlay  
 Edith von Wilpert as Tanzschullehrerin

References

Bibliography 
 Schoeps, Karl-Heinz. Literature and Film in the Third Reich. Camden House, 2004.

External links 
 

1938 films
Films of Nazi Germany
German drama films
French black-and-white films
1938 drama films
1930s German-language films
Films directed by Jacques Feyder
Circus films
German multilingual films
German black-and-white films
1938 multilingual films
Films shot at Bavaria Studios
Tobis Film films
1930s German films